Karl Asplund (27 April, 1890 – 3 April, 1978) was a Swedish poet, short story writer and art historian. He made his literary debut in 1912, and was awarded the Dobloug Prize in 1955.

References

1890 births
1978 deaths
Dobloug Prize winners
Swedish male poets
Swedish art historians
20th-century Swedish poets
20th-century Swedish male writers